Chaetostoma milesi is a species of catfish in the family Loricariidae. It is native to South America, where it occurs in the basins of the Magdalena River and the Apure River. The species reaches 13 cm (5.1 inches) SL. It appears in the aquarium trade, where it is most frequently referred to as either the bulldog pleco or the rubbernose pleco.

References 

milesi
Fish described in 1941